Xiang Lang (160s - 247), courtesy name Juda, was an official and scholar of the state of Shu Han during the Three Kingdoms period of China. He previously served under the warlords Liu Biao and Liu Bei (later the founding emperor of Shu Han) in the late Eastern Han dynasty. In 243, Xiang Lang resigned and spent the remaining years of his life reading, writing, proofreading and editing various classical texts. By the time of his death in 247, he was one of the foremost book collectors of his time and a major source of influence for many later scholars. He was an uncle of the Shu general Xiang Chong.

Early career 
Xiang Lang was from Xiangyang Commandery, Jing Province and was born in Yicheng, Hubei. In his youth, Xiang Lang was a student of Sima Hui alongside Han Song, Pang Tong, Xu Shu and Zhuge Liang. Among them, all were close and friendly. Known for his intelligence, he was appointed as the Chief of Linju County by Liu Biao. Upon Liu Biao's death, Xiang Lang went to serve under Liu Bei.

Service under Liu Bei 
After Liu Bei conquered the lands south of the Yangtze River, he put Xiang Lang in charge of all military and civil affairs of Mushan, Yidao, Yiling and Zigui counties. After Liu Bei seized control of Yi Province (covering present-day Sichuan and Chongqing) from Liu Zhang in 214, he appointed Xiang Lang as the Administrator of Baxi Commandery. Later, Xiang Lang was reassigned to serve as the Administrator of Zangke Commandery and then as the Administrator of Fangling Commandery.

Service under Liu Shan 
In 223, after Liu Shan succeeded his father Liu Bei as the emperor of Shu, he appointed Xiang Lang as a Colonel of Infantry and as Chief Clerk to the Imperial Chancellor, Zhuge Liang. In 225, when Zhuge Liang led the Shu forces on a campaign to pacify rebellions in the Nanzhong region, he left Xiang Lang in charge of domestic affairs at Shu's imperial capital, Chengdu.

In 228, when Zhuge Liang led Shu forces on the first of a series of campaigns against Shu's rival state, Cao Wei, he brought Xiang Lang along and left him in charge of the Shu base at Hanzhong Commandery. The Shu vanguard, led by Ma Su, suffered a devastating defeat at the Battle of Jieting against Wei forces led by Zhang He. Xiang Lang received news that Ma Su fled his post after the defeat, but due to his friendship with Ma Su, he did not report it to Zhuge Liang. Later, after Zhuge Liang found out, he was so furious that he dismissed Xiang Lang and sent him back to Chengdu.

Some years later, Xiang Lang returned to serve in the Shu government as Minister of the Household. In 234, after Zhuge Liang's death, Liu Shan promoted Xiang Lang to the position of General of the Left and enfeoffed him as the Marquis of Xianming Village in recognition of his past contributions.

When he was young, even if he didn't study the fundamentals, Xiang Lang did study diligently through literature and for his ability as an official received many praises. From the moment he was dismissed from his office as Chief Clerk, he observed, traveled and reflected for almost thirty years. He concentrated his mind and heart on the collection of records working assiduously and never slacking. When he was more than eighty years old, he would still check personally each document and would correct and check any errors personally. He collected many books, volumes and scrolls and at the time had the largest library. He would welcome any guests and would teach and receive many of the later generations, but only to debate over ancient principles and not speaking about current affairs. For this, he was respected from those still in office to those who were not yet adult scholars. Whatever the status, all honored him. He died in 247.

Xiàng Tiáo 
Xiang Lang's son, Xiàng Tiáo (向條) succeeded him and during the Jingyao era (景耀; 258–263) of Liu Shan's reign, became Censorate Central Deputy.

The Xiangyang Ji recorded that Xiang Lang's last words to his son were :

It also states that Xiàng Tiáo courtesy name was Wenbao (文豹), and was famous for his wide range of studies and talents. He later joined the Jin government as the Administrator of Jiangyang and Major of the South Central Army.

See also
 Lists of people of the Three Kingdoms

Notes

References

 Chen, Shou (3rd century). Records of the Three Kingdoms (Sanguozhi).
 Pei, Songzhi (5th century). Annotations to Records of the Three Kingdoms (Sanguozhi zhu).

2nd-century births
247 deaths
Liu Biao and associates
Shu Han politicians
Officials under Liu Bei
Chinese scholars
People from Xiangyang
Han dynasty politicians from Hubei
Political office-holders in Sichuan
Political office-holders in Hubei